"Managing the Echo System" is a 10-page Disney comics story written, drawn, and lettered by Carl Barks. Characters in the story include Donald Duck, his nephews Huey, Dewey and Louie, a zookeeper, and members of the Nature Boys club.  The story was first published in Walt Disney's Comics & Stories #105 (June 1949). The story has been reprinted several times since. 

In the story, Donald tests his ability to make echoes at Thrushwhistle Glen for an upcoming meeting of the Nature Boys. Meanwhile, his nephews use various ruses to get 60 cents from him to attend a baseball game.

See also
 List of Disney comics by Carl Barks

References

External links
 Managing the Echo System

Disney comics stories
Donald Duck comics by Carl Barks
1949 in comics